Tresserre is a commune in the Pyrénées-Orientales department in southern France.

Geography 
Tresserre is located in the canton of Les Aspres and in the arrondissement of Perpignan.

Demography

Sites of interest 
 The Saint-Saturnin church, partly romanesque.
 The Saint-Étienne de Nidolères church, romanesque but in ruins.

See also
Communes of the Pyrénées-Orientales department

References

Communes of Pyrénées-Orientales